Othukkungal  is an outgrowth of the city of Malappuram in Kerala, India.  It is located just 5 km from the town.  It is part of the Proposed Malappuram Municipal Corporation.

Demographics
 India census, Othukkungal had a population of 34882 with 16821 males and 18061 females.

References

Suburbs of Malappuram
Cities and towns in Malappuram district